The Ill-Conceived P. D. Q. Bach Anthology is a collection of works by Peter Schickele writing as P. D. Q. Bach originally recorded on the Telarc label by the composer.

Performers
 Professor Peter Schickele, conductor, bass, devious instruments
 The Greater Hoople Area Off-Season Philharmonic, Newton Weyland, conductor
 The Okay Chorale
 Members of The New York Pick-Up Ensemble
 Grandmaster Flab and the Hoople Funkharmonic
 Turtle Mountain Naval Base Tactical Wind Ensemble, Lowell Graham, conductor
 Donna Brown as Blondie
 Elliott Forrest as Jocko
 Pamela South, soprano (Billie Jo Casta)
 Dana Krueger, mezzo-soprano (Madame Peep), chef
 Frank Kelley, tenor
 Brice Audrus, horn
 Peter Lurye, piano, Station ID
 Christopher O'Riley, piano

Track listing 
 1. This is Professor Pete (0:55)
 2. 1712 Overture, S. 1712 (P.D.Q. Bach) (11:33)
 3. Introduction (0:13)
Oedipus Tex, dramatic oratorio for soloists, chorus and orchestra, S. 150 (P.D.Q. Bach)
4. II. Aria with chorus: "Howdy There" (5:32)
5. Recitative: "It Wasn't Long" (0:28)
6. III. My Heart (4:02)
7. Recitative: "When Oedipus Heard" (1:01)
8. VI. Chorale and Finale (4:18)
 9. Introduction
 10. "Love Me" (Leiber & Stoller) (2:34)
 11. WTWP Station ID (0:14) (see WTWP Classical Talkity-Talk Radio)
 12. Oo-La-La Introduction (0:24)
 13. Oo-La-La: Cookin' French Like the French Cook French (2:39)
 14. Introduction
The Musical Sacrifice, S. 50% off (P.D.Q. Bach)
15. I. Fuga Meshuga (2:46)
 16. Introduction
 17. "Classical Rap", S. 1-2-3 (P.D.Q. Bach) (8:24)
 18. Introduction
The Short-Tempered Clavier, Preludes and Fugues in All the Major and Minor Keys Except for the Really Hard Ones, S. 3.14159, easy as (P.D.Q. Bach)
19. I. C Major (2:46)
 20. Introduction
Grand Serenade for an Awful Lot of Winds & Percussion, S. 1000 (P.D.Q. Bach)
21. II. Simply Grand Minuet (2:52)
 22. Introduction
Four Folk Song Upsettings, S. 4 (P.D.Q. Bach)
23. Little Bunny Hop Hop Hop (1:50)
 24. Introduction (0:50)
 25. "Minuet Militaire", S. 1A (P.D.Q. Bach) (3:40)
 26. Enough Already (0:13)

Sources
 The Ill-Conceived P.D.Q. Bach Anthology, schickele.com

P. D. Q. Bach compilation albums
1998 compilation albums
1990s comedy albums
Telarc Records compilation albums